The Calder Game is a children's novel written by Blue Balliett and illustrated by Brett Helquist, published in 2008. It is the sequel to The Wright 3, which in turn is the sequel to Chasing Vermeer.  Some underlying themes include the art of Alexander Calder, pentominoes, and the freedom of public art.

Plot overview
Calder Pillay travels with his father to a Woodstock, Oxfordshire and becomes interested in an unexpected Alexander Calder sculpture (who coincidentally is his namesake) in the town square. On the same night, both Calder and the sculpture disappear. His friends Petra and Tommy fly to England to aid his father in finding him.

Critical reception
The Calder Game received mainly positive reviews. School Library Journal called it "every bit as intricate, engaging, and delightful" as its two precursors and praised the structure of the novel. Publishers Weekly was positive and wrote that it was "an ambitious novel". BookPage's Alice Cary praised the pacing and intriguing questions. The website Kidsreads.com claimed that The Calder Game is "Balliett's best work of fiction yet".

However, Kirkus Reviews felt that The Calder Game "falls short of Chasing Vermeer brilliance" and it was marred by a "problematic construction and too many tidy dei ex machinis".

References

2008 novels
Novels set in Oxfordshire
2008 children's books